The sooty tyrannulet (Serpophaga nigricans) is a species of bird in the family Tyrannidae, the tyrant flycatchers. It is small, usually weighing 9 grams with a length of 12 centimeters, and has gray or brownish-grey feathers with black tail feathers.
It is found in Argentina, Brazil, and Uruguay; also southern Paraguay. A small extension of its range is in southeastern Bolivia.

Its natural habitats are subtropical or tropical moist shrubland, rivers, and swamps.

References

External links
Sooty tyrannulet videos on the Internet Bird Collection
Sooty tyrannulet photo gallery VIREO

sooty tyrannulet
Birds of South America
sooty tyrannulet
Taxa named by Louis Jean Pierre Vieillot
Taxonomy articles created by Polbot